Zoltán J. Gál (born 3 May 1973) is a Hungarian politician and journalist, who served as spokesman of the Hungarian government from 27 May 2002 to 2 August 2004. His father is Zoltán Gál a former Interior Minister and Speaker of the National Assembly of Hungary.

He worked for the Népszabadság, the Magyar Hírlap and the Népszava as journalist. He became a member of the National Assembly in 2002 from the Hungarian Socialist Party's national list. Péter Medgyessy unseated him on 2 August 2004 but after few days the Prime Minister also fell. According to the press information Gál had good relation with the Minister of Youth Affairs and Sports Ferenc Gyurcsány. Maybe as a result he returned to the politics as political state secretary of the Prime Minister's Office when Gyurcsány was appointed PM.

Gál gained a parliamentarian seat on the 2006 elections again. He hold his position of state secretary. On 21 January 2008 he resigned referring to family reasons. His successor was Ádám Ficsor. According to the press Gál's relation with the Prime Minister decayed. He served as editor-in-chief of weekly Vasárnapi Hírek ("Sunday News") from 2010 to 2017. In the 2019 local elections, Zoltán Gál J., along with Dávid Dorosz, was one of the two campaign managers of Gergely Karácsony, who was elected Mayor of Budapest.

References

 Biography on the webpage of the National Assembly

1973 births
Living people
Hungarian Socialist Party politicians
Hungarian journalists
Government spokespersons of Hungary
Members of the National Assembly of Hungary (2002–2006)
Members of the National Assembly of Hungary (2006–2010)